Avet Ter-Gabrielyan (April 7, 1899 - June 19, 1983) was an Armenian violinist and the founder of the Komitas Quartet. Avet Gabrielyan Music School in Yerevan is named in his honor.

Early life 
Avet Ter-Gabrielyan was born on April 19, 1899, in Nor Nakhichevan (now Proletarsky District, Rostov-on-Don).

Education 
He studied violin under Nicholas Averino (father of soprano Olga Averino) in Rostov-on-Don before continuing his studies at the Moscow State Tchaikovsky Conservatory with Lev Tseitlin.

Career
In November 1924, Ter-Gabrielyan co-founded Komitas Quartet. He was the quartet's first violin from 1925 to 1976. The ensemble performed with such musicians as Konstantin Igumnov and Heinrich Neuhaus.

Aram Khachaturian dedicated to Ter-Gabrielyan his "Dance" (1933).

From 1929 Ter-Gabrielyan taught at the Moscow Conservatory.

Death 
Gabrielyan died on June 19, 1983, in Moscow.

Awards
1945: People's Artist of the Armenian SSR

External links
Komitas Quartet

1899 births
1983 deaths
Armenian violinists
Russian people of Armenian descent
Musicians from Rostov-on-Don
People's Artists of Armenia
20th-century violinists